The Nigerian football (soccer) club Enyimba won the 2003 African Champions League title, beating Ismaily SC of Egypt.

In the first round on April 13, 2003, Enyimba defeated Satellite FC of Guinea, winning 3–0 in Aba. In the second leg in Conakry, Enyimba thrashed the Guineans 5–2. The Peoples' Elephant won the tie 8–2 on aggregate.

The second round match held on 18 May in Aba against ASC Jeanne d'Arc of Senegal ended 4–0 to Enyimba.  The second leg at the Leopold Sedar Senghor Stadium in Dakar ended goalless as the Senegalese failed to score. Enyimba therefore qualified for the group state of the competition with a 4-0 aggregate victory.

After the draw for the group stage in Cairo, Egypt, Enyimba was drawn in group A with Simba FC of Tanzania, ASEC Mimosas of Côte d'Ivoire and Ismaily of Egypt.

In the first group match in Aba, Enyimba beat Simba  3–0. This victory sent a wrong signal to both players and officials who perhaps thought that the team had indeed arrived. This was not to be, as the Peoples Elephant received the greatest defeat in their history; a 6-1 demolition against Ismali in Ismailia, Egypt.

This loss turned out to be the tonic the club needed. Enyimba at the end of the day qualified for the semi-final of the competition beating ASEC Mimosa 3–1 in Aba and 2–0 in Abidjan. They lost to Simba 1-2 but defeated Ismaili with a 4–2 victory in Aba. Enyimba thus topped the group with 12 points after 6 matches, while Ismaili came second with 11 points.

In the Semi-finals, Enyimba held Union Sportive de la Medina of Algeria to a 1–1 draw in Algiers and in the return leg the Algerians nearly upstaged The Peoples' Elephant as they opened  the scoring in the 5th minute of the game. However, Enyimba equalized before the end of the first half. In the second half, the Algerians held on until the 85th minute when Michael Ochei, who equalized in the first leg again came to the rescue with the much needed goal to crush the stubborn USMA team.

This victory set up the final with the same Ismaily who also qualified for the finals.  In the first leg played in Aba, the People's Elephant triumphed against the Egyptians with a 2–0 victory. The second leg perhaps looked easy for the Egyptians who felt they would re-enact the 6-1 demolition of the quarter-final. But they were in for the greatest shock of their lives as the Kadiri Ikhana-touted side lost to the Egyptians by a lone goal through a controversial penalty. Enyimba emerged victorious with a 2-1 aggregate and Captain Romanus Orjinta lifted the trophy to high heavens.

This defeat was to the Egyptians, unacceptable and the Egyptian media were so disappointed that they went as far as going off air in the live television coverage, thereby preventing the entire Africa and the rest of the world from watching the cup presentation. Enyimba players and their hundreds of supporters who came in chartered planes were held at the Ismailia stadium for over three hours after the match on the advice of the Egyptian police who first cleared the fans who had laid ambush outside the stadium waiting to attack the new African champions.

Back home in Nigeria, the entire nation went wild with jubilation as everybody, irrespective of their club affiliation were ecstatic. To them Nigeria had won. The President of the Federal Republic of Nigeria, Chief Olusegun Obasanjo honored the golden boys of Enyimba with a state banquet.

Back home in Aba and Abia state, the club financier and state Governor, Dr. Orji Uzor Kalu declared a public holiday in honor of The Peoples Elephant. In appreciation of the promise he made to the players and officials, a grand reception was organized while the team, in a carnival went round the entire state to have personal contact with their fans. The Governor gave out one Kia Car to each player and official while the Club Chairman; Felix Anyansi-Agwu got a Jeep.

Squad

 Dele Aiyenugba
 Ndidi Anumunu
 Vincent Enyeama
 Victor Ezeji
 Ekene Ezenwa
 Eric Facindo
 Joetex Frimpong
 Ahmed Garba
 Yusuf Mohamed
 Abubakar Musa
 Obinna Nwaneri
 Michael Ochei
 Mouritala Ogunbiyi
 Seyi Ogunsanya
 Nonso Lawrence
 Onyekachi Okonkwo
 Uga Okpara
 Ajibade Omolade
 Romanus Orjinta
 David Tyavkase
 Kadiri Ikhana (Manager)

Next season

While many thought the victory of Enyimba was a flash in the pan, the club re-enacted the victory in 2004, beating Etoile Sportive Du Sahel of Tunisia in the finals in Abuja. This was after defeating the same Tunisians’ in February in the Champion of Champions (Super Cup).

Both legs had ended 2-1 and in the ensuring penalty shootout, Enyimba's reserve Goalkeeper; Dele Aiyenugba came in as a last minute substitute and saved two penalties. Dele had earlier in the Semi-final match against Esperance, also of Tunisia secured victory for Enyimba through another penalty shoot out. Dele Aiyenugba thus became a household name in the country.

References 

2003